Paki may refer to:
Paki, California, former settlement in Butte County
Paki (slur), a derogatory term for a person of Pakistani or South Asian background
Pākī (1808–1855), Hawaiian high chief during the reign of King Kamehameha III

See also 
Pâquis
Packy
Ithikkara Pakki, a Muslim outlaw who lived in the 19th century Travancore Kingdom
Tsikoudia (ρακί)